This is a list of works by American science fiction and fantasy author Anne McCaffrey, including some cowritten with others or written by close collaborators.

Restoree
McCaffrey's first novel was Restoree, published by Ballantine Books in 1967.

 Restoree (1967)

Federated Sentient Planets universe
Several of McCaffrey's series and more than half her books share as background a universe governed by the "Federated Sentient Planets" or "Federation" or "FSP".

Dragonriders of Pern series

McCaffrey's most famous works are the Dragonriders of Pern series.

Short stories and novellas
 "Weyr Search", Analog Magazine, October 1967 (later incorporated into Dragonflight)
 "Dragonrider", Analog Magazine – two parts, December 1967/January 1968 (later incorporated into Dragonflight)
 "The Smallest Dragonboy", Science Fiction Tales edited by Roger Elwood (Rand McNally, 1973) reprinted in A Gift of Dragons, and Get Off The Unicorn.
 "A Time When", N.E.S.F.A. Press, hardcover limited edition printed for guest of honor appearance at Boskone (a convention in Boston) 1975 (later incorporated into The White Dragon)
 "Rescue Run", Analog Magazine, Aug.1991 (later incorporated into The Chronicles of Pern: First Fall)
 "The P.E.R.N. Survey", Amazing Magazine, Sept.1993 (later incorporated into The Chronicles of Pern: First Fall)
 "The Dolphin's Bell", published as a limited edition, leatherbound book by The Wildside Press, 1993 (later incorporated into The Chronicles of Pern: First Fall)
 "The Girl Who Heard Dragons", originally published as a Tor Book by Tom Doherty Associates, LLC, in 1994 and in A Gift of Dragons, also Cheap Street Press, 1986
 "Runner of Pern", Legends, an anthology edited by Robert Silverberg
 "Ever the Twain", A Gift of Dragons
 "Beyond Between", Legends II: New Short Novels by the Masters of Modern Fantasy, edited by Robert Silverberg

Books
 in publication order: for a list in Pern historical order see Chronological list of Pern books
 "Weyr Search" (Analog, Oct 1967) – novella
 "Dragonrider" (Analog, Dec 1967 and Jan 1968) – novella
 Dragonflight (1968) ,   – fix-up of "Weyr Search" and "Dragonrider"
 Dragonquest (1971) 
 "The Smallest Dragonboy" (1973, in Science Fiction Tales, ed. Roger Elwood); also in non-Pern collections Get Off the Unicorn and A Gift of Dragons
 "A Time When" (1975) (NESFA Press) 
 Dragonsong (1976) 
 Dragonsinger (1977) 
 The White Dragon (1978)  – incorporating "A Time When"
 Dragondrums (1979) 
 Moreta: Dragonlady of Pern (1983) 
 Nerilka's Story (1986) 
 "The Girl Who Heard Dragons" (1986 novella); also in the non-Pern collection of the same name
 Dragonsdawn (1988) 
 The Renegades of Pern (1989) 
 All the Weyrs of Pern (1991) 
 "Rescue Run" (Analog 111:10, August 1991)
 The Chronicles of Pern: First Fall (1993)  – Pern short story collection
 "The Survey: P.E.R.N." (also in Amazing, September 1993)
 "The Dolphins' Bell"
 "The Ford of Red Hanrahan"
 "The Second Weyr"
 "Rescue Run" (1991)
 The Dolphins of Pern (1994) 
 Red Star Rising (hard) or Red Star Rising: Second Chronicles of Pern (paper) (1996)     or Dragonseye (US release) 
 The Masterharper of Pern (1998) 
 "Runner of Pern" (1998, in the anthology Legends, ed. Robert Silverberg )
 The Skies of Pern (2001) 
 A Gift of Dragons (2002)  – Pern short story collection
 "The Smallest Dragonboy" (1973)
 "The Girl Who Heard Dragons" (1986 novella)
 "Runner of Pern" (1998)
 "Ever the Twain" (2002)
 Dragon's Kin (2003) (Anne & Todd McCaffrey) 
 "Beyond Between" (2003, in the anthology Legends II, ed. Robert Silverberg )
 Dragonsblood (2005) (Todd McCaffrey) 
 Dragon's Fire (2006) (Anne & Todd McCaffrey) 
 Dragon Harper (2007) (Anne & Todd McCaffrey) 
 Dragonheart (2008) (Todd McCaffrey) 
 Dragongirl (2010) (Todd McCaffrey) 
 Dragon's Time (June 2011) (Anne & Todd McCaffrey) 
 Sky Dragons (2012) (Anne & Todd McCaffrey) 
 Dragon’s Code (2018) (Gigi McCaffrey) 
 After the Fall (in progress)

The Brain & Brawn Ship series

The Brain & Brawn Ship series comprises seven novels. Only the first was written by Anne McCaffrey alone, a fix-up of five previously published stories.

The Ship books are set in the same universe as the Crystal Singer books, as Brainship-Brawn pairings were characters in the second and third volumes of that series.
 The Ship Who Sang (1969) (fix-up of stories from 1961, 1966, and 1969) 
 PartnerShip (1992) with Margaret Ball, 
 The Ship Who Searched (1992) with Mercedes Lackey, 
 The City Who Fought (1993) with S.M. Stirling, 
 The Ship Who Won (1994) with Jody Lynn Nye, 
This series also includes solo entries by Stirling and Nye:
 The Ship Errant (1996) by Jody Lynn Nye, 
 The Ship Avenged (1997) by S.M. Stirling, 
All but the first were issued in omnibus editions of two as Brain Ships (2003, McCaffrey, Ball & Lackey); The Ship Who Saved the Worlds (2003, McCaffrey & Nye); The City and the Ship (2004, McCaffrey & Stirling).

The Crystal series
The Crystal series, as catalogued by the Internet Speculative Fiction Database under the name Crystal Universe, comprises five novels published from 1982 and four earlier short stories that were a basis for the first book, The Crystal Singer. Three of the novels compose the Crystal trilogy, or Crystal Singer trilogy after the first of them.

 Crystal trilogy, or Crystal Singer trilogy
 Crystal Singer (1982)  (based on four stories published 1974/1975)
 Killashandra (1986) 
 Crystal Line (1992) 
Omnibus editions were published as The Crystal Singer Trilogy (1996) and The Crystal Singer Omnibus (1999).

ISFDB catalogues two other novels as "Crystal Universe" books.
 The Coelura (1983) 
 Nimisha's Ship (1998)

Ireta

The Ireta series, as catalogued by ISFDB, comprises five novels, two "Dinosaur Planets" by Anne McCaffrey 1978 and 1984, and three "Planet Pirates" written with co-authors in the 1990s.

They share a fictional premise and some characters. The events of Dinosaur Planet overlap with the final chapters of The Death of Sleep, as does Dinosaur Planet Survivors with Sassinak; Generation Warriors continues and concludes the storylines of both series.

The Dinosaur Planet series
When the Exploration and Evaluation Corps team reached the planet Ireta, dinosaurs were not what they expected to find.
 Dinosaur Planet (1978) 
 Dinosaur Planet Survivors (1984) 
Omnibus editions have been issued under the titles The Ireta Adventure (1985), The Dinosaur Planet Omnibus (2001), and The Mystery of Ireta (2004).

The Planet Pirates trilogy

All is not well in the FSP: pirates attack the spacelanes. In this series, survivors on Ireta and survivors of space pirate attacks join forces.
 Sassinak (1990-03-01) with Elizabeth Moon, 
 The Death of Sleep (1990-06-01) with Jody Lynn Nye, 
 Generation Warriors (1991-02-01) with Elizabeth Moon, 
Omnibus edition: The Planet Pirates (1993).

The Talents universe

"The Talents Universe", as catalogued by the Internet Speculative Fiction Database, comprises two series. They share one fictional premise. Eight books, all by Anne McCaffrey alone, are rooted in her second story (1959) and three stories published in 1969.

The Talent series
 To Ride Pegasus (1973) (collection of stories from 1969 and 1973) 
 Pegasus in Flight (1990) 
 Pegasus in Space (2000)

The Tower and Hive series
 The Rowan (1990) (partly based on the 1959 story "Lady in the Tower") 
 Damia (1991) (partly based on the 1969 short "A Meeting of Minds") 
 Damia's Children (1993) 
 Lyon's Pride (1994) 
 The Tower and the Hive (1999)

Doona

 Decision at Doona (1969) 
 Crisis on Doona (1992) with Jody Lynn Nye, 
 Treaty at Doona (1994) with Jody Lynn Nye,  (Originally Treaty Planet)
Omnibus edition of the latter two: Doona (2004).

Petaybee universe

The Petaybee universe comprises two trilogies by Anne McCaffrey and Elizabeth Ann Scarborough.

Powers trilogy
 Powers That Be (1993) with Elizabeth Ann Scarborough, 
 Power Lines (1994) with Elizabeth Ann Scarborough, 
 Power Play (1995) with Elizabeth Ann Scarborough,

The Twins of Petaybee series
 Changelings (2005) with Elizabeth Ann Scarborough, 
 Maelstrom (2006) with Elizabeth Ann Scarborough, 
 Deluge (2008) with Elizabeth Ann Scarborough,

The Barque Cat series 

This duology is a collaboration between Anne McCaffrey and Elizabeth Ann Scarborough that introduces a new universe with Barque Cats and their special telepathically linked humans.

Catalyst (2010) with Elizabeth Ann Scarborough
Catacombs (December 2010) with Elizabeth Ann Scarborough

The Freedom series 

The Freedom series or "Catteni Sequence" comprises one 1970 short story and four Freedom novels written 1995 to 2002.
 Freedom's Landing (1995)  (based on the 1970 short story "The Thorns of Barevi")
 Freedom's Choice (1996) 
 Freedom's Challenge (1998) 
 Freedom's Ransom (2002)

Acorna universe

The "Acorna Universe series" comprises ten novels published 1997 to 2007, seven sometimes called Acorna and three sometimes called Acorna's Children. The first two were written by Anne McCaffrey and Margaret Ball, the rest by McCaffrey and Elizabeth Ann Scarborough.

Acorna series
 Acorna: The Unicorn Girl (1997) with Margaret Ball, 
 Acorna's Quest (1998) with Margaret Ball, 
 Acorna's People (1999) with Elizabeth Ann Scarborough, 
 Acorna's World (2000) with Elizabeth Ann Scarborough, 
 Acorna's Search (2001) with Elizabeth Ann Scarborough, 
 Acorna's Rebels (2003) with Elizabeth Ann Scarborough, 
 Acorna's Triumph (2004) with Elizabeth Ann Scarborough,

Acorna's Children series
 First Warning (2005) with Elizabeth Ann Scarborough, 
 Second Wave (2006) with Elizabeth Ann Scarborough, 
 Third Watch (2007) with Elizabeth Ann Scarborough,

Short story collections
 Get Off the Unicorn (1977) 
 The Girl Who Heard Dragons (1994) (contains one Pern story by the same name)

Romances
 The Mark of Merlin (1971) 
 Ring of Fear (1971) 
 The Kilternan Legacy (1975) 
 Stitch in Snow (1985) 
 The Year of the Lucy (1986) 
 The Lady (1987)  (also published as The Carradyne Touch)
Three Women contains the first three listed in an omnibus edition.

Children's books
 An Exchange of Gifts (1995) 
 No One Noticed the Cat (1996) 
 If Wishes Were Horses (1998) 
 Black Horses for the King (1998)  – Arthurian historical novel

Anthologies
Alchemy and Academe (1970)
Space Opera (1996) with Elizabeth Ann Scarborough,

Nonfiction

Cookbooks
 Cooking Out of This World (1973), edited by A.M.; revised 1992, 
 Serve it Forth: Cooking with Anne McCaffrey (1996), edited with John Betancourt,

Dragons
 A Diversity of Dragons (1997), by A.M. and Richard Woods, illustrated by John Howe, Atheneum Books,  – ISFDB says, "Cataloged as fiction by the Library of Congress even though it's part non-fiction and part art book."

Notes

References

External links

 
 
 
 Pern Home —"the website for Pern and The Dragonriders of Pern™".

Bibliographies by writer
Bibliographies of American writers
Science fiction bibliographies
Bibliography